Bohdan Smishko (born 20 August 1978) is a Ukrainian former professional football defender. He is a brother of goalkeeper Roman Smishko.

Smishko started his football career at amateur level playing for FC Dnister Ovidiopol.

References

External links
 
 

1978 births
Living people
People from Cēsis
Latvian people of Ukrainian descent
Ukrainian footballers
FC Dnister Ovidiopol players
FC Chornomorets Odesa players
FC Chornomorets-2 Odesa players
FC Enerhiya Yuzhnoukrainsk players
FC Zirka Kropyvnytskyi players
FC Spartak Sumy players
FC Zorya Luhansk players
FC Dnipro Cherkasy players
MFC Mykolaiv players
FC Oleksandriya players
FC Arsenal-Kyivshchyna Bila Tserkva players
FC Real Pharma Odesa players
Expatriate footballers in Sweden
Ukrainian expatriate footballers
Ukrainian Premier League players
Association football defenders